The First Unitarian Church of Portland is a church building located in downtown Portland, Oregon, listed on the National Register of Historic Places. Located on S.W. 12th Avenue at Salmon Street, it was constructed and opened in 1924.

History

In 1979, the Unitarian church purchased a larger church located directly adjacent, the original First Church of the Nazarene of Portland, which had been built in 1921.  The Nazarene church congregation was preparing for construction of a new, larger building in the Sylvan neighborhood, so decided to sell their original building.

The former Nazarene building (at 1211 S.W. Main Street), which adjoins the First Unitarian Church but with its entrance oriented to the corner of 12th and Main, has been regularly used for Sunday services by the Unitarian church since 1993 and is currently the church's primary sanctuary, but the 1921 building is not listed on the National Register of Historic Places.  The NRHP-listed 1924 building is still owned and used by the First Unitarian Church of Portland, and church members refer to it as the Eliot Chapel after the first minister, Thomas Lamb Eliot. Eliot Chapel was designed by Jamieson K. Parker, while the former Nazarene building was designed by Raymond W. Hatch.

See also
 National Register of Historic Places listings in Southwest Portland, Oregon

References

Further reading

External links

1924 establishments in Oregon
Churches completed in 1924
Churches in Portland, Oregon
Churches on the National Register of Historic Places in Oregon
Colonial Revival architecture in Oregon
Georgian Revival architecture in Oregon
National Register of Historic Places in Portland, Oregon
Portland Historic Landmarks
Southwest Portland, Oregon